William Henry Allsop (29 January 1912 – 24 April 1997) was an English footballer who played as a full-back for Bolton Wanderers, Port Vale and Halifax Town in the 1930s and 1940s.

Career
Allsop played for Ripley Town and Bolton Wanderers, before joining Port Vale as an amateur in June 1931. He signed as a professional in August 1931 and made his debut on 16 January 1932, in a 2–0 win over Bristol City at Ashton Gate. He played the last five games of the 1932–33 season, but was not selected again after that and was given a free transfer from The Old Recreation Ground to Halifax Town in May 1934. He had played six Second Division games and one FA Cup game for the "Valiants". He went on to make 242 league appearances for Halifax. He appeared as a guest for both Aldershot and Derby County during the war.

Career statistics
Source:

References

1912 births
1997 deaths
People from Ripley, Derbyshire
Footballers from Derbyshire
English footballers
Association football defenders
Ripley Town F.C. players
Bolton Wanderers F.C. players
Port Vale F.C. players
Halifax Town A.F.C. players
Aldershot F.C. wartime guest players
Derby County F.C. wartime guest players
English Football League players